Sunday in New York is an album by Eric Alexander, with John Hicks, John Webber, and Joe Farnsworth.

Recording and music
The album was recorded at Avatar Studio in New York on March 18, 2005. The four musicians are tenor saxophonist Eric Alexander, pianist John Hicks, bassist John Webber, and drummer Joe Farnsworth. The material is standards, plus "Avotcja" by Hicks.

Release and reception

Sunday in New York was released by Venus Records. The AllMusic reviewer described it as "an outstanding date".

Track listing
"Sunday in New York"
"Avotcja"
"Dearly Beloved"
"Like Someone in Love"
"Watch What Happens"
"My Girl Is Just Enough Woman for Me"
"Alone Together"
"My Romance"

Personnel
Eric Alexander – tenor saxophone
John Hicks – piano
John Webber – bass
Joe Farnsworth – drums

References

2005 albums
Eric Alexander (jazz saxophonist) albums
Venus Records albums